Suzie Brasher (born in 1960 or 1961) is an American former competitive figure skater. She won the World Junior Championships in 1976, its inaugural year. She was first in compulsory figures, second in the short program, and first in the free skate. Brasher, then a student at Olympus High School in Holladay, Utah, was named the 1976 Sportsperson of the Year in Utah. She is now a coach at Cottonwood Heights FSC in Salt Lake City, Utah.

Results

References

Navigation

American female single skaters
Living people
World Junior Figure Skating Championships medalists
Figure skaters from Salt Lake City
Year of birth uncertain
21st-century American women
Year of birth missing (living people)